Hallstatt may refer to:
 Hallstatt, a town in Austria
 Hallstatt (China), a housing development in China based upon the town in Austria
 Hallstätter See, or Lake Hallstatt, on which Hallstatt is located
 Hallstatt culture, an archaeological culture of which Hallstatt is the type site
 Hallstatt Museum, located in Hallstatt, Austria
 Hallstatt plateau, an anomaly in carbon dating
 Hallstatt cycle, a hypothesized solar variability cycle
 Hallstatt Lecture, the name of a lecture series